The communauté de communes du Plateau de Gentioux was created on December 15, 1992 and is located in the Creuse and Corrèze departements of the Limousin  region of central France. It was created in January 1993. It was merged into the new Communauté de communes Creuse Grand Sud in January 2014.

It comprised the following 7 communes:

Faux-la-Montagne
Gentioux-Pigerolles
La Nouaille
Peyrelevade (in the département of Corrèze)
Saint-Marc-à-Loubaud
La Villedieu
Saint-Yrieix-la-Montagne

See also
Communes of the Creuse department

References 

Plateau de Gentioux
Plateau de Gentioux